Parapoynx fulguralis is a moth in the family Crambidae. It was described by Aristide Caradja and Edward Meyrick in 1934. It is found in the Chinese provinces of Guangdong, Yunnan and Sichuan.

References

Acentropinae
Moths described in 1934